Christianity is  professed by 0.5% of the population of the state of Gujarat in India.

History

The French or Catalan Dominican missionary Jordanus Catalani was the first European to start conversion in Gujarat region. He arrived in Surat in 1320.The Portuguese controlled the area of Daman and Diu on  Gujarat coast for many centuries and brought catholicism with them. IThe Charter Act of 1813  passed by the British parliament curtailed the power of the East India Company and allowed entry of christian missionaries to areas controlled by the company.
Notable early Missionaries included John Taylor M. D. (d. 1821), Joseph Taylor (d. 1852), his son J. V. S. Taylor (d. 1881) the translator of the Gujarati Bible "Old Version" (1861, rev. 1899), and his grandson George Pritchard Taylor (b. 1854) author of a Gujarati grammar. Missionaries established schools in the first half of the 20th century. Gujarati Christian and Khristie Bandhu are Gujarati Protestant monthlies published from Ahmedabad. Khristie Bandhu being older publication than Gujarati Christian. Doot  is Gujarati Catholic monthly published from Anand, Gujarat since January 1911.

Denominations

Roman Catholicism
The Catholic church in the state is governed from three ecclesiastical districts. These are 
the Roman Catholic Diocese of Ahmedabad, the Roman Catholic Archdiocese of Gandhinagar, the Roman Catholic Diocese of Baroda, and the Syro-Malabar Catholic Diocese of Rajkot

Protestant churches
The Protestant Church of North India has jurisdiction over 
Diocese of Gujarat. The Methodist Church in India, one of the largest Protestant Christian denominations, also has a Diocese of Gujarat. The Salvation Army and The Christian and Missionary Alliance Church churches too can be found in the state.

Malankara Orthodox Syrian Church
The Malakara Syrian Church in the state is governed by Orthodox Diocese of Ahmedabad.

Other denominations
Apart from this many free or independent churches are  prominent in the state including many designated as Bible Churches. Although  small in number they are very strong in their ideas adhering to The Holy Bible. Gandhinagar, the capital city of the state of Gujarat, is a home to Green City Bible Church, stationed on the prominent Sarkhej - Gandhinagar Highway.

The state has anti-conversion legislation.

References